Wivenhoe railway station is on the Sunshine Coast Line, a branch of the Great Eastern Main Line, in the East of England, serving the small town of Wivenhoe, Essex. It is  down the line from London Liverpool Street and is situated between Hythe to the west and Alresford to the east. Its three-letter station code is WIV.

The station was opened by the Tendring Hundred Railway, a subsidiary of the Great Eastern Railway, in 1863. It has two platforms, a staffed ticket office, and is currently operated by Abellio Greater Anglia, which also runs all trains serving the station.

It is a short distance from the River Colne at Wivenhoe quay and its car park is the starting point of the Wivenhoe Trail, a cycle track that runs alongside the river to Colchester.

History
Wivenhoe station was opened on 8 May 1863 by the Tendring Hundred Railway, which was worked by the Great Eastern Railway. From July 1879 its name was spelt Wyvenhoe; in October 1911 it reverted to the original spelling, Wivenhoe.

This branch was opened in 1866 and closed as part of the Beeching cuts in 1964 and the tracks lifted. A bridge over Alresford Creek was also later demolished.

Services 

The typical Monday to Saturday service is of two trains per hour in each direction. The other "up" train calls at Hythe and  before terminating at Colchester.

On Sundays there is typically one train per hour in each direction. The London-bound train calls at Colchester, Witham, Chelmsford, Shenfield and Stratford before terminating at Liverpool Street. The country-bound train calls at Alresford, Great Bentley and Thorpe-le-Soken before terminating at Clacton-on-Sea.

Colchester Town and Weeley are closed on Sundays. Stations on the Walton branch are accessed by an hourly Sunday shuttle from Thorpe-le-Soken.

References

External links 

Railway stations in Essex
DfT Category E stations
Former Great Eastern Railway stations
Railway stations in Great Britain opened in 1863
Greater Anglia franchise railway stations
Wivenhoe